Yanina Wickmayer was the defending champion, but chose to participate in the 100,000+H ITF event in Torhout, Belgium.

Ana Ivanovic won the title, defeating Patty Schnyder in the final 6–1, 6–2, in 45 minutes. This was her second title in Linz, and was her first career title since winning this tournament in 2008.

Seeds

Draw

Finals

Top half

↑Ana Ivanovic was docked one game in the first set for taking too long during a bathroom break.

Bottom half

References

External links
 Main Draw
 Qualifying Draw

Generali Ladies Linz - Singles